Shirin M. Rai  (born 1 December 1960), is an interdisciplinary scholar who works across the political science and international relations boundaries. She is known for her research on the intersections between international political economy, globalisation, post-colonial governance, institutions and processes of democratisation and gender regimes. She was a professor of politics and international studies at the University of Warwick, and is the founding director of Warwick Interdisciplinary Research Centre for International Development (WICID).

In July 2022, she was confirmed as the distinguished research professorship in the Department of Politics and International Relations at the School of Oriental and African Studies (SOAS), University of London. She took up her post at SOAS in September 2022.

Biography
Shirin M. Rai was born in New Delhi, India and attended Modern School. After securing her BA at Hindu College, Delhi University and MA in the Department of Political Science, Delhi University, India, she carried out her doctoral research on Chinese liberalisation and educational reforms at Christ’s College and Faculty of Social and Political Sciences, University of Cambridge.

Rai joined the Department of Politics and International Studies, University of Warwick as the first woman to be appointed as a full-time lecturer, in 1989 and served there until 2022. She is now distinguished research professor in SOAS, Department of Politics and International Studies.

Rai is honorary professor in the Department of Politics and International Studies, University of Warwick, visiting professor (2021 -) at the Department of Gender Studies at LSE, and an adjunct professor at Monash University.

Research

Shirin M. Rai is an interdisciplinary scholar and has written extensively on issues of gender, governance and development, and politics and performance. She is the co/author of 5 monographs, has co/edited 15 volumes and has written numerous articles in high impact journals.

Rai has recently been working on issues of gendered care and work and the costs of this care work, which she (together with Catherine Hoskyns and Dania Thomas) theorised as ‘depletion through social reproduction’.   She is a Co-Investigator for the UKRI-funded Consortium on Practices for Wellbeing and Resilience in Black, Asian and Minority Ethnic Families and Communities and is using the depletion framework to study the impact of racism during COVID-19, on Care, Caring and Carers in the Midlands.

Rai has also developed an interdisciplinary framework across the social sciences/humanities boundaries - politics and performance - to study politics and political institutions. This emerged out of Rai’s Leverhulme Trust programme on Gendered Ceremony and Ritual in Parliament (2007–2011), of which she was director. Building on this work Rai became interested in exploring the nature of performance in/as politics. Her recent books in this field include Performing Representation, a commentary on women MPs in the Indian Parliament, as well as co-edited the OUP Handbook of Politics and Performance.

Rai’s work within feminist political economy examines gendered regimes of work and survival under globalisation, which include privatisation of natural resources, and the changing nature of work. Her books in this field are Gender and the Political Economy of Development (2002), Gender Politics of Development (2008) and New Frontiers in Feminist Political Economy (ed, with Georgina Waylen). She has also worked on questions of gender relations and their relationships to shifting patterns of economic and political governance – see Global Governance: Feminist Perspectives (2008).

Her earlier work also focused strongly on democratisation. In 2000 she edited International Perspectives on Gender and Democratization. As the acting director of the Centre for the Study of Democratisation at the University of Warwick, she (with Wyn Grant) launched a book series with Manchester University Press on Perspectives on Democratisation, which was re-launched under a new title, Perspectives on Democratic Practice, in 2007.  Rai has also served on the Editorial Board of the journal Democratization.

Rai has also collaborated with the UN Women, United Nations Development Programme, United Nations Department of Economic and Social Affairs and the World Bank for consultancy work, and public speaking engagements.

Shirin M. Rai is a member of various professional societies such as the Political Studies Association, British International Studies Association and International Studies Association and has served on the Governing Council of the International Studies Association (2009–2011). She has served as co-Editor of the journal Social Politics, and is member of the editorial boards of publications such as:  Indian Journal of Gender Studies, International Feminist Journal of Politics, Global Ethics and Review of International Studies.

Honours 
In July 2022 Rai was awarded the British International Studies Association Distinguished Contribution Award.

In 2021 Rai was elected a fellow of the British Academy

In 2017, the Political Studies Association named its PhD dissertation prize for international relations the Shirin M. Rai prize in recognition of her contributions to the discipline of feminist international relations and international political economy.

Rai was awarded the Feminist Theory and Gender Studies Eminent Scholar Award by the International Studies Association in 2015

In 2010 Rai was elected as a Fellow of the Academy of Social Sciences.

Publications

A detailed list of Rai's publications can be found here. A selection of her works is listed below:

Authored Books
 
 
 
 
 Rai, Shirin M; Spary, Carole (2019). Performing Representation: Women Members in the Indian Parliament. OUP.

Edited Books
 
 
 
 
 
 
 
 
 
 
 The OUP Handbook of Performance and Politics (lead editor, with Milija Gluhovic, Silvija Jestrovic and Michael Saward), New York, Oxford University Press, 2020
 The Grammar of Performance and Politics (with Janelle Reinelt), London, Routledge, 2015 (Interventions Series)
 New Frontiers in Feminist Political Economy (with Georgina Waylen) Routledge IAFFE Advances in Feminist Economics, London, Routledge, 2014
 Democracy in Practice: Ceremony and Ritual in Parliaments (eds. with Rachel E. Johnson), Basingstoke, Palgrave Macmillan, 2014
 Ceremony and Ritual in Parliament, London: Routledge, 2010
 Global Governance: Feminist Perspectives (eds. With Georgina Waylen) London, Palgrave Macmillan, 2008 ISBN 0230537049; ISBN 978-0230537040

Articles
 
 
 
 
 
 
 
 
 
 
  Pdf. from Center for the Study of Globalization and Regionalization, Warwick University.
 From Depletion to Regeneration: Addressing Structural and Physical Violence in Post-Conflict Economies (2020)
 Feminist everyday political economy: Space, time, and violence (2019),
 SDG 8: Decent work and economic growth- A gendered analysis (with Benjamin D. Brown and Kanchana N. Ruwanpura) (2019) World Development 113, 368–380
 Upendra Baxi: feminism, law, and the human (2018), Jindal Global Law Review, Volume 9 Number 2 DOI 10.1007/s41020-018-0078-y
 Feminist everyday political economy: Space, time, and violence (with Juanita Elias) (2018), Review of International Studies doi:10.1017/S0260210518000323
 The Good Life and the Bad: The Dialectics of Solidarity (March 2018) Social Politics: International Studies in Gender, State & Society Volume 25, Issue 1 Pages 1–19 
 Recognising the full costs of care? The Gendered Politics of Compensation for families in South Africa’s silicosis class action (with Beth Goldblatt) (November 2017), Social and Legal Studies DOI: 10.1177/0964663917739455
 ‘Political Performance: A Framework for Analyzing Democratic Politics’ (2014)

References

External links 
 Rai's page on MacMillion publishers
 Rai's page on University of Warwick
 Rai's page on Feminism and Institutionalism Network

1960 births
Indian political scientists
Indian emigrants to England
Indian feminists
Living people
Postmodern feminists
Indian women scholars
Scholars from Delhi
20th-century Indian social scientists
20th-century Indian women scientists
Women educators from Delhi
Educators from Delhi
Women political scientists
Fellows of the British Academy